The European Tyre and Rim Technical Organisation (ETRTO) exists to specify and harmonise sizes of rims and their associated pneumatic tyres across the European Union.  ETRTO sizes apply to rims and tyres for vehicles of all types, including bicycles.  The great advantage of ETRTO sizing is that it is unambiguous; previously, nominal dimensions were used which were interpreted in different ways by different countries and manufacturers - a problem for the end user.

ETRTO works in liaison with the International Organization for Standardization to develop relevant standards.

See also 
 ISO 5775 – standard bicycle tyre and rim designations
 Uniform Tire Quality Grading

References

External links 
ETRTO home page

Motor trade associations
Pan-European trade and professional organizations
Standards organisations in Belgium
Tire industry